SexTV is a Canadian documentary television series which explores many issues about human sexuality. The show premiered in 1998 which aired on Citytv and channels owned by CHUM Limited, and spun off a television channel called SexTV: The Channel in 2001. 

Airing in a late-night timeslot, the series was a news magazine covering a broad array of topics relating to sex and sexuality.

The program was the subject of a complaint to the Canadian Broadcast Standards Council in 1999, after an advertisement for the show was perceived by a viewer as degrading to men because it implied that men think about sex every eight seconds. The complaint was dismissed in August 2000.

The series received eight Gemini Award nominations over the course of its run, winning Best Lifestyle/General Interest Series at the 19th Gemini Awards in 2004.

References

External links
 

1998 Canadian television series debuts
2008 Canadian television series endings
1990s Canadian documentary television series
2000s Canadian documentary television series
Citytv original programming
Television series by Bell Media
Sex education television series